Lancaster Rural District was a rural district in the county of Lancashire, England. It was created in 1894 and abolished in 1974 under the Local Government Act 1972.

It was made up of 22 civil parishes to the north and south of the city of Lancaster.

It had a population of 8,837 in 1901 and 14,018 in 1961.

Parishes 
The parishes included  in the rural district for at least some of its history included:

Aldcliffe (to 1935)
Ashton with Stodday
Bolton-le-Sands
Bulk (to 1900)
Cockerham
Cockersand Abbey (to 1930)
Ellel
Heaton-with-Oxcliffe
Heysham (1894-1899)
Middleton
Overton
Over Wyresdale
Priest Hutton
Scotforth
 Silverdale
Skerton (1894-1900)
Slyne-with-Hest
Thurnham
Warton (1935-1974)
Warton with Lindeth
Yealand Conyers
Yealand Redmayne

References

External links
Map of Lancaster RD at Vision of Britain

 

History of Lancashire
Districts of England created by the Local Government Act 1894
Districts of England abolished by the Local Government Act 1972
Rural districts of England